is a railway station in the Yūrakuchō district of Chiyoda, Tokyo, Japan, operated by East Japan Railway Company (JR East) and the Tokyo subway operator Tokyo Metro. It is Tokyo Metro's fifteenth busiest station in 2016.

Lines
Yūrakuchō is served by the JR East Keihin-Tōhoku Line and Yamanote Line, and the Tokyo Metro Yūrakuchō Line subway. On Tokyo subway maps, nearby Hibiya Station is marked as an interchange and is linked to Yurakucho by underground passages.

Platforms

JR East Platforms

Tokyo Metro Platforms

History 

The elevated JR station opened on June 25, 1910. The subway station opened on October 30, 1974.

Chest-high platform edge doors were installed on the Yamanote Line platforms in July 2014, with operation scheduled to begin on 30 August 2014.

Passenger statistics
In fiscal 2013, the JR East station was used by an average of 167,365 passengers daily (boarding passengers only), making it the fourteenth-busiest station operated by JR East. In fiscal 2013, the Tokyo Metro station was used by an average of 158,809 passengers per day (exiting and entering passengers), making it the sixteenth-busiest station operated by Tokyo Metro. The average daily passenger figures for each operator in previous years are as shown below.

 Note that JR East figures are for boarding passengers only.

See also

 List of railway stations in Japan

References

External links

The Tokyo Virtual Tour: Yūrakuchō Station
Yamanote29: Yūrakuchō

Yamanote Line
Keihin-Tōhoku Line
Tokyo Metro Yurakucho Line
Tōkaidō Main Line
Stations of East Japan Railway Company
Stations of Tokyo Metro
Railway stations in Tokyo
Railway stations in Japan opened in 1910